Tatti may refer to :

People
 Calliope Tatti (1894–1978)
 Francesco de Tatti, a 16th-century Italian painter
 Jessica Tatti (born 1981), German politician

Places
 Tatti, Massa Marittima, a hamlet in the Italian municipality of Massa Marittima
 Tatti, Merki District, a village located in the Merki District of the Jambyl region, Kazakhstan
 I Tatti Renaissance Library